Wind in the Wires is the second studio album by English singer-songwriter Patrick Wolf.

Wolf cites Buffy Sainte-Marie as an influence on the album on his official Tumblr.

Critical reception

Wind in the Wires received general acclaim.  At Metacritic, which assigns a normalized rating out of 100 to reviews from mainstream critics, the album received an average score of 80, based on 20 reviews, which indicates "generally favorable reviews."

Track listing
All songs written by Patrick Wolf.

"The Libertine" – 4:23
"Teignmouth" – 4:50
"The Shadowsea" – 0:37
"Wind in the Wires" – 4:18
"The Railway House" – 2:24
"The Gypsy King" – 3:08
"Apparition" – 1:16
"Ghost Song" – 3:13
"This Weather" – 4:35
"Jacob's Ladder" – 1:21
"Tristan" – 2:36
"Eulogy" – 1:44
"Land's End" – 7:06

Personnel
Patrick Wolf — vocals, viola, violin, grand piano, baritone ukulele, kantele, mountain dulcimer, Farfisa Transivox Electronic Accordion, reed organ, guitar, bass guitar, synthesizers, bodhrán.
Derek Apps — clarinet on "Wind in the Wires"
Jo Apps — female choir on "Teignmouth"

References

Patrick Wolf albums
2005 albums